Lactifluus is a genus of milk cap fungi in the family Russulaceae. Its species were formerly classified in Lactarius but have been split off as separate genus based on molecular phylogenetic evidence. A 2017 revision divided the genus in four subgenera:  Lactifluus, Lactariopsis, Gymnocarpi and Pseudogymnocarpi. Within the subgenera, sections have been recognised, but not all of the roughly 150 species could be assigned to named sections.

Subgenus Lactifluus

Lactifluus subg. Lactifluus

Lactifluus sect. Lactifluus

Lactifluus acicularis (Van de Putte & Verbeken) Van de Putte 2012
Lactifluus bicapillus De Crop, Lescroart, Njouonkou, et al., 2019
Lactifluus corrugis (Peck) Kuntze 1891
Lactifluus crocatus (Van de Putte & Verbeken) Van de Putte 2012
Lactifluus distantifolius (Van de Putte, Stubbe & Verbeken) Van de Putte 2012
Lactifluus jetiae L. Vaughan, L. Tegart, J. Douch & T. Lebel
Lactifluus lamprocystidiatus (Verbeken & E.Horak) Verbeken 2012
Lactifluus longipilus (Van de Putte, H.T.Le & Verbeken) Van de Putte 2012
Lactifluus oedematopus (Scop.) Kuntze (1891)
Lactifluus pagodicystidiatus L. Vaughan, L. Tegart & J. Douch
Lactifluus pinguis (Van de Putte & Verbeken) Van de Putte 2012
Lactifluus rugulostipitatus J. Douch, L. Tegart, L. Vaughan & T. Lebel
Lactifluus vitellinus (Van de Putte & Verbeken) Van de Putte 2012
Lactifluus volemus (Fr.) Kuntze (1891)

Lactifluus sect. Gerardii

Lactifluus atrovelutinus (J.Z.Ying) X.H.Wang 2012
Lactifluus bicolor (Massee) Verbeken 2012
Lactifluus conchatulus (Stubbe & H.T.Le) Stubbe 2012
Lactifluus coniculus (Stubbe & Verbeken) Verbeken 2012
Lactifluus genevievae (Stubbe & Verbeken) Stubbe 2012
Lactifluus hora (Stubbe & Verbeken) Stubbe 2012
Lactifluus igniculus E.S.Popov & O.V.Morozova 2013
Lactifluus leae (Stubbe & Verbeken) Verbeken 2012
Lactifluus leonardii (Stubbe & Verbeken) Stubbe 2012
Lactifluus limbatus (Stubbe & Verbeken) Stubbe 2012
Lactifluus ochrogalactus (Hashiya) X.H.Wang 2012
Lactifluus parvigerardii X.H.Wang & D.Stubbe 2012
Lactifluus petersenii (Hesler & A.H.Sm.) Stubbe 2012
Lactifluus reticulatovenosus (Verbeken & E.Horak) Verbeken 2012
Lactifluus sepiaceus (McNabb) Stubbe 2012
Lactifluus subgerardii (Hesler & A.H.Sm.) Stubbe 2012
Lactifluus uyedae (Singer) Verbeken 2012
Lactifluus venosus (Verbeken & E.Horak) Verbeken 2012
Lactifluus wirrabara (Grgur.) Stubbe 2012

Lactifluus sect. Tenuicystidiati
Lactifluus tenuicystidiatus (X.H.Wang & Verbeken) X.H.Wang 2012

Lactifluus sect. Ambicystidiati
Lactifluus ambicystidiatus

Lactifluus sect. Allardii (Hesler & A.H.Sm.) De Crop 2012

Lactifluus allardii (Coker) De Crop 2012

Lactifluus sect. Piperati (Fr.) Verbeken 2012
Lactifluus dwaliensis (K.Das, J.R.Sharma & Verbeken) K.Das 2012
Lactifluus glaucescens (Crossl.) Verbeken 2012
Lactifluus leucophaeus (Verbeken & E.Horak) Verbeken 2012
Lactifluus piperatus (L.) Kuntze (1891) 
Lactifluus roseophyllus (R.Heim) De Crop 2012

Subgenus Lactariopsis

Lactifluus subgen. Lactariopsis (Henn.) Verbeken 2011

Lactifluus sect. Albati (Bataille) Verbeken 2011

Lactifluus bertillonii (Neuhoff ex Z.Schaef.) Verbeken 2011
Lactifluus deceptivus (Peck) Kuntze (1885)
Lactifluus pilosus (Verbeken, H.T.Le & Lumyong) Verbeken 2011
Lactifluus subvellereus (Peck) Nuytinck 2011
Lactifluus vellereus (Fr.) Kuntze (1821)

Lactifluus sect. Edules (Verbeken) Verbeken 2017
Lactifluus aureifolius (Verbeken) Verbeken 2011
Lactifluus edulis (Verbeken & Buyck) Buyck 2011
Lactifluus indusiatus (Verbeken) Verbeken 2011
Lactifluus inversus (Gooss.-Font & R.Heim) Verbeken 2011
Lactifluus latifolius (Gooss.-Font & R.Heim) Verbeken 2011
Lactifluus nodosicystidiosus (Verbeken & Buyck) Buyck 2011
Lactifluus phlebophyllus (R.Heim) Buyck 2011
Lactifluus roseolus (Verbeken) Verbeken 2011

Lactifluus sect. Lactariopsis (Henn.) Verbeken 2011
Lactifluus annulatoangustifolius (Beeli) Buyck 2011
Lactifluus chamaeleontinus (R.Heim) Verbeken 2011
Lactifluus heimii (Verbeken) Verbeken 2011
Lactifluus laevigatus (Verbeken) Verbeken 2011
Lactifluus pelliculatus (Beeli) Buyck 2011
Lactifluus pruinatus (Verbeken & Buyck) Verbeken 2011
Lactifluus sesemotani (Beeli) Buyck 2011
Lactifluus velutissimus (Verbeken) Verbeken 2011
Lactifluus zenkeri (Henn.) Verbeken 2011

Lactifluus sect. Russulopsidei (Verbeken) Verbeken 2011
Lactifluus cyanovirescens (Verbeken) Verbeken 2011
Lactifluus longipes (Verbeken) Verbeken 2011
Lactifluus ruvubuensis (Verbeken) Verbeken 2011
Lactifluus urens (Verbeken) Verbeken 2011

Not assigned to a section
Lactifluus annulifer (Singer) Nuytinck 2011
Lactifluus brachystegiae (Verbeken & C.Sharp) Verbeken 2011
Lactifluus cocosmus (Van de Putte & De Kesel) Van de Putte 2012
Lactifluus densifolius (Verbeken & Karhula) Verbeken 2011
Lactifluus emergens (Verbeken) Verbeken 2011
Lactifluus leoninus (Verbeken & E.Horak) Verbeken 2011
Lactifluus neotropicus (Singer) Nuytinck 2011
Lactifluus madagascariensis (Verbeken & Buyck) Buyck 2011

Subgenus Gymnocarpi

Lactifluus sect. Luteoli

Lactifluus brunneoviolascens (Bon) Verbeken 2012
Lactifluus longivelutinus (X.H.Wang & Verbeken) X.H.Wang 2012
Lactifluus luteolus (Peck) Verbeken 2012
Lactifluus nonpiscis (Verbeken) Verbeken 2012
Lactifluus rubrobrunnescens (Verbeken, E.Horak & Desjardin) Verbeken 2012

Lactifluus sect. Gymnocarpi
Lactifluus albocinctus (Verbeken) Verbeken 2012
Lactifluus caribaeus (Pegler) Verbeken 2012
Lactifluus flammans (Verbeken) Verbeken 2012
Lactifluus gymnocarpus (R.Heim ex Singer) Verbeken 2012
Lactifluus putidus (Pegler) Verbeken 2012
Lactifluus tanzanicus (Karhula & Verbeken) Verbeken 2012

Lactifluus sect. Phlebonemi (R.Heim ex Verbeken) Verbeken 2012
Lactifluus brunnescens (Verbeken) Verbeken 2012
Lactifluus phlebonemus (R.Heim & Gooss.-Font.) Verbeken 2012

Lactifluus sect. Tomentosi (McNabb) Verbeken 2012

Lactifluus albens T. Lebel, J. Douch & L. Vaughan
Lactifluus aurantioruber (McNabb) J.A. Cooper
Lactifluus clarkeae (Cleland) Verbeken 2012
Lactifluus subclarkeae (Grgur.) Verbeken 2012
Lactifluus flocktoniae (Cleland & Cheel) T. Lebel
Lactifluus psammophilus T. Lebel, J. Douch & L. Vaughan
Lactifluus pseudoflocktoniae T. Lebel, J. Douch, L. Tegart &  L.  Vaughan

Not assigned to a section
Lactifluus foetens (Verbeken) Verbeken 2012

Subgenus Pseudogymnocarpi

Lactifluus sect. Aurantiifolii (Verbeken) Verbeken 2012
Lactifluus aurantiifolius (Verbeken) Verbeken 2012

Lactifluus sect. Polysphaerophori (Singer) Verbeken 2012
Lactifluus pegleri
Lactifluus veraecrucis (Singer) Verbeken 2012

Lactifluus sect. Pseudogymnocarpi (Verbeken) Verbeken 2012

Lactifluus gymnocarpoides (Verbeken) Verbeken 2012
Lactifluus hygrophoroides (Berk. & M.A.Curtis) Kuntze (1891)
Lactifluus longisporus (Verbeken) Verbeken 2012
Lactifluus medusae (Verbeken) Verbeken 2012
Lactifluus luteopus (Verbeken) Verbeken 2012
Lactifluus pseudogymnocarpus (Verbeken) Verbeken 2012
Lactifluus pumilus (Verbeken) Verbeken 2012
Lactifluus pseudoluteopus (X.H.Wang & Verbeken) X.H.Wang 2012
Lactifluus rugatus (Kühner & Romagn.) Verbeken 2012
Lactifluus sudanicus Maba, Yorou & Guelly 2014

Lactifluus sect. Rubroviolascentini (Singer) Verbeken 2012
Lactifluus carmineus (Verbeken & Walleyn) Verbeken 2012
Lactifluus denigricans (Verbeken & Karhula) Verbeken 2012
Lactifluus kigomaensis De Crop & Verbeken 2012
Lactifluus rubroviolascens (R.Heim) Verbeken 2012

Lactifluus sect. Xerampelini
Lactifluus goossensiae (Beeli) Verbeken 2012
Lactifluus kivuensis (Verbeken) Verbeken 2012
Lactifluus pseudovolemus (R.Heim) Verbeken 2012
Lactifluus rubiginosus (Verbeken) Verbeken 2012
Lactifluus xerampelinus (Karhula & Verbeken) Verbeken 2012

Not assigned to sections
Lactifluus volemoides (Karhula) Verbeken 2012

Unassigned species
Lactifluus arsenei (R.Heim) Verbeken 2012
Lactifluus angustus (R.Heim & Gooss.-Font.) Verbeken 2012
Lactifluus annulatolongisporus (Maba) Maba 2015
Lactifluus austrovolemus (Hongo) Verbeken 2012
Lactifluus burkinabei  Maba 2015
Lactifluus guellii  Maba 2015
Lactifluus brunneocarpus (Maba) Maba 2015
Lactifluus caperatus (R.Heim & Gooss.-Font.) Verbeken 2012
Lactifluus corbula (R.Heim & Gooss.-Font.) Verbeken 2011
Lactifluus claricolor (R.Heim) Verbeken 2011
Lactifluus fazaoensis Maba, Yorou & Guelly 2014
Lactifluus flavellus Maba & Guelly 2015
Lactifluus longibasidius Maba & Verbeken 2015
Lactifluus membranaceus (Maba) Maba 2015
Lactifluus melleus Maba 2015
Lactifluus pisciodorus (R.Heim) Verbeken 2012
Lactifluus pseudotorminosus (R.Heim) Verbeken 2011
Lactifluus puberulus (H.A.Wen & J.Z.Ying) Nuytinck 2011
Lactifluus pallidilamellatus (Montoya & Bandala) Van de Putte 2012
Lactifluus princeps (Berk.) Kuntze (1891)
Lactifluus novoguineensis (Henn.) Verbeken 2012
Lactifluus olivescens (Verbeken & E.Horak) Verbeken 2012
Lactifluus paleus (Verbeken & E.Horak) Verbeken 2012
Lactifluus pectinatus Maba & Yorou (2015)
Lactifluus subiculatus S.L.Mill., Aime & T.W.Henkel 2013
Lactifluus subpiperatus (Hongo) Verbeken 2012

References

Lactifluus species, List of
Lactifluus